is a 2011 Japanese anime television series produced by Tatsunoko Productions and Avex Pictures in cooperation with Takara Tomy and Syn Sophia, based on the arcade game of the same name. The series is part of the Pretty Rhythm franchise and an adaptation of Takara Tomy's 2010 arcade game Pretty Rhythm: Mini Skirt, which focuses on a group of Japanese idols known as "Prism Stars" that combine song and dance with fashion and figure skating. The anime is a tie-in to the Aurora Dream edition of the game, introducing a new character Aira Harune, along with returning character Rizumu Amamiya.

During the series' run, each episode included a live-action segment titled "Pretty Rhythm Studio" hosted by Akina Minami and the Prism Mates, who debuted late into the series as Prizmmy. After the show's end, it was followed up by a sequel titled Pretty Rhythm: Dear My Future in 2012.

Plot

The series takes place in Yokohama, Japan. Prism Shows, performances that are a combination of singing, dancing, fashion, and ice skating, are popular. The skaters, known as Prism Stars, use Prism Stones to coordinate their outfits and perform Prism Jumps to appeal to their fans.

Aira Harune and Rizumu Amamiya are suddenly scouted to be Prism Stars after Mion Takamine drops out of her debut showcase. Though Aira has no experience in performing, her fashion focus reveals her innate talent as a Prism Star. On the other hand, Rizumu is centered on perfecting "Aurora Rising", the legendary Prism Jump her mother once performed, in hopes that it may help her find her mother again. After Mion returns and bonds with them, the three girls debut as the Prism Star group "MARs."

After Rizumu's mother mysteriously reappears, Aira, Rizumu, and Mion enter the Prism Queen series to compete for the title of Prism Queen and perfect "Aurora Rising" to heal her. To do so, each girl must obtain a rare Prism Stone set containing wedding outfits from various tournaments, as performing "Aurora Rising" requires wearing a wedding outfit and devoting oneself to Prism Shows only.

Media

Game

Beginning with the season 4, the original Pretty Rhythm: Mini Skirt arcade game was relaunched under the name Pretty Rhythm: Aurora Dream on April 28, 2011 to coincide with the anime adaptation tie-in, with Aira Harune added as a playable character. The game also featured a new system called a "Surprise Jump." Season 5, "Baton Pom Pom Edition", launched on July 21, 2011. Season 6, "Idol Debut Edition", launched on September 29, 2011. Season 7, "Pretty Remake Edition", launched on December 15, 2011 and added Mion Takamine as a playable character. Season 8, "Prism Queen Edition", launched on February 12, 2012.

Anime

Pretty Rhythm: Aurora Dream, an animated adaptation of the 2010 arcade game Pretty Rhythm: Mini Skirt, was announced in January 2011. While the original game focused on Rizumu as the main protagonist, the anime focuses on Aira, a new character added into the Aurora Dream edition of the game. The series was produced by Tatsunoko Production and aired on TV Tokyo between April 9, 2011 and March 31, 2012. The series was originally set to debut on April 2, 2011, but it was postponed by a week due to the 2011 Tohoku earthquake. The English dub aired on Animax Asia from January 31, 2014 to April 11, 2014. In addition to the television series, several two-minute shorts titled Prism Comedy Theater were released exclusively onto the DVD home releases.

A live-action variety show segment titled "Pretty Rhythm Studio" appeared in every episode. It was hosted by Akina Minami and was centered on the Prism Mates, three trainees from Avex Dance Master consisting of Mia Kusakabe, Reina Kubo, and Karin Takahashi, chronicling their training in dance, singing, and fashion sense to debut as idols, like the main characters in the show. Near the end of the series, the Prism Mates debuted in the group Prizmmy along with Ayami Sema, the winner of the Pretty Rhythm Award at the Kiratto Entertainment Challenge Contest 2011 Summer.

The opening theme songs are "You May Dream" by Lisp for episodes 1-29 and "1000% Kyun Kyun Sasete yo" by Pretty Rhythm All Stars for episodes 30-51. The ending theme songs are "Happy Go Lucky (Happy Lucky de Go)" by Super Girls for episodes 1-12; "We Will Win (Kokoro no Baton de Po Pon no Pon)" by Tokyo Girls' Style for episodes 13-26; "Pretty Rhythm de Go" by MARs (Kana Asumi, Sayuri Hara, and Azusa Kataoka as their characters) for episodes 27-39; and "Everybody's Gonna Be Happy" by Prizmmy for episodes 40-51.

Manga

A manga adaptation of the same name was written by Rio Fujimi and serialized in Ciao from 2011 to 2012. It was later compiled in two bound volumes by Shogakukan under the Ciao Comics imprint. It ran concurrently with Pretty Rhythm, the first manga adaptation based on Pretty Rhythm: Mini Skirt. The manga adaptation is centered on a middle school student named Flare Nanri, a fan of Prism Stone and an aspiring fashion designer.

Sequels

Pretty Rhythm: Dear My Future

A sequel set three years after Aurora Dream, titled Pretty Rhythm: Dear My Future, aired between April 7, 2012 and March 30, 2013. The anime series was a tie-in to promote the Dear My Future edition of the Pretty Rhythm arcade game. The English dub for Dear My Future premiered on Animax Asia April 14, 2014 for Southeast Asian distribution. Characters based on the girl group Prizmmy became the new main cast, while a new set of trainees from Avex Dance Master became part of Prism Mates featured in the "Pretty Rhythm Studio" live-action segments in every episode. The host of the "Pretty Rhythm Studio" segments is MC Kensaku.

In an attempt to market the franchise to South Korea, Puretty, temporarily named "DSP Girls", debuted through the show with characters based on the members appearing as the secondary cast, with the real-life members also appearing in the live-action segments. In the Korean dub of the series, the "Charming School at Prism Stone" live-action segments aired instead of "Pretty Rhythm Studio", with the real-life members of Puretty starring in them.

References

External links
  at Takara Tomy 
 Pretty Rhythm: Aurora Dream official anime website

Pretty Rhythm
2011 anime television series debuts
2011 manga
Japanese children's animated sports television series
Anime films based on video games
Anime television series based on video games
Arcade video games
Arcade-only video games
Music in anime and manga
Shogakukan manga
Shōjo manga
Sports anime and manga
Syn Sophia games
Takara Tomy franchises
Tatsunoko Production
TV Tokyo original programming
Japanese idols in anime and manga
Figure skating in anime and manga
Video games developed in Japan